Al-Falah Cultural, Social and Sports Club (Arabic: الفلاح عطبرة) is a football club from Atbara, Sudan.

In the 2019–20 season, the club participated in the 2019–20 Sudan Premier League.

References

Football clubs in Sudan